RCPV Noronha Academy of Administration and Management (where RCPV stands for Ronald Carlton Piyadade Vivian) is the apex and nodal training institute of Madhya Pradesh, India. It organises training programmes for the senior officers of the government of Madhya Pradesh, government of India and Public Sector Undertakings. It has been effectively playing an advisory role for the Madhya Pradesh government in Human Resource Development. It is also a coordinating institution for the various training institutions of the state.

History
Established in 1966 as Lal Bahadur Shastri Institute of Public Administration, the Academy of Administration and Management trains the officers of the State Government, Government of India and Public Sector Undertakings. Ronald Carlton Vivian Piadade Noronha, ICS, was a distinguished civil servant who served as Chief Secretary of the state for almost 10 years (1963–1968, 1972–1974). This Institution has been honoured with the National Award of Excellence by Govt. of India, in the field of 'Trainers Training'. Again in 1999 it has been honoured as the best Institution in formulating Total Quality Management action plan. The Academy has been certified by ISO 9001:2000 from SGS (UK)in 2003. Distinguished civil servants of Chief Secretary rank are posted as Directors General of the Academy. The current Director General is Mr. I. S. Dani. Before him Dr Abha Asthana was Director General from 20-12-2011 to 30-09-2013.

Vision
To provide leadership for quality improvement in public service in the state of Madhya Pradesh.

Objectives
RCVP Noronha Academy of Administration assists and advises the government of Madhya Pradesh in evolving training policies for its departments. It also provides guidance to other training activities so as to develop a federated system of training programmes for direct recruits of the higher services of the state.

Location
RCVP Noronha Academy of Administration is situated in the southeastern part of the Bhopal on the banks of Shahpura Lake in a  campus. It is surrounded by natural beauty, which provides a pleasant environment.

Director General

References

External links
 https://web.archive.org/web/20070814125650/http://www.mp.nic.in/mpacademy/

Education in Bhopal
State agencies of Madhya Pradesh
Public administration schools in India